PVR Raja (born Penumatsa Venkata Ramaraju; 1 June 1985), is an Indian music composer, record producer, songwriter and guitarist who works in Telugu cinema. He has composed music for the films Vitamin She (2020) and Madhi (2022). 

Raja won Andhra Pradesh state award in 2011 National Youth Festival (India) in guitar category. He initially composed music for over 250 Short films and Independent films. He is nicknamed "Short Films Maestro".

Early life 
PVR Raja was born as Penumatsa Venkata Ramaraju on 1 june 1985 to Penumatsa Chandra Sekhar Raju and Penumatsa Satyavathi in Vizianagaram, Andhra Pradesh. He completed Bachelor of Arts (B.A.), Bachelor's Degree from Andhra University in 2005 and studied music at Maharajah's Government College of Music and Dance. He worked as a music teacher before being a music composer.

Career 
Raja made his debut as a music director with the short film Arya 3 produced by Puri Jagannadh own production company Vaishno Academy. He provided the background score for the film 1 Hour produced by actress and politician Roja Selvamani. Raja composed music for the movie Atma Rama Ananda Ramana produced by Annapurna College of Film and Media and streaming on aha.
He has predominantly composed music over 250 digital short films and Independent films from 2013 to present in English, Telugu, Kannada and Hindi languages. Raja worked as music director  for the short films under the own production and direction of actor and writer L. B. Sriram. He won the first place in Andhra pradesh state level competitions for  guitar category in National Youth Festival 2011 organized by Ministry of Youth Affairs and Sports, Government of India. His albums released in major record labels in India such as Vitamin She in Times Music and Madhi in  Aditya Music.

Awards and nominations
 2007, Got top 18th place in 7 Up Ooh La La La band hunt conducted by music director A. R. Rahman.
 2011, National Youth Festival competitions 1st place in Andhra Pradesh guitar category.
 2013, Semi finalist in Hyderabad Times Fresh face 2013 competitions.
 2017, Won best music director award for Itlu Mee Laila short film in Telugu Association of North America International Telugu Short Film Awards.
 Nominated in SIIMA short film awards 2020 for Antharardham for best music director category.

Discography

Singles and album songs

References

External links 

Living people
Telugu film score composers
Film musicians from Andhra Pradesh
People from Vizianagaram
People from Vizianagaram district
Year of birth missing (living people)
1985 births
Indian male composers
21st-century Indian composers
Male film score composers